Allen Robert Lachowicz (born September 6, 1960) is an American former Major League Baseball pitcher.  The right-hander was drafted by the Texas Rangers in the 1st round (24th pick) of the 1981 amateur draft, and he appeared in two games for the Rangers during the last three weeks of the 1983 season.

On September 13, 1983, Lachowicz made his major league debut at the Oakland–Alameda County Coliseum and pitched two scoreless innings of relief in a 6-5 loss to the Oakland Athletics. Lachowicz struck out Bill Almon for his first major league strikeout. Nineteen days later at Arlington Stadium he started the last game of the season. In front of a small crowd of 8,727 he pitched six strong innings, giving up just two earned runs, but the Rangers lost to the California Angels 2-0.

Career totals include a 0-1 record, eight strikeouts in eight innings pitched, and an earned run average of 2.25.

External links

Retrosheet

1960 births
Living people
Texas Rangers players
Major League Baseball pitchers
Baseball players from Pittsburgh
Pittsburgh Panthers baseball players
Gulf Coast Rangers players
Tulsa Drillers players
Oklahoma City 89ers players
Jackson Mets players
Clearwater Phillies players
Reading Phillies players
American people of Polish descent